Frédéric Brun can refer to:

 Frédéric Brun (cyclist, born 1957), French cyclist
 Frédéric Brun (cyclist, born 1988), French cyclist
 Frédéric Brun (writer), born 1960, French writer